The 2022 Dayton Flyers football team represented the University of Dayton  as a member of the Pioneer Football League during the 2022 NCAA Division I FCS football season. The Flyers were led by 14th-year head coach Rick Chamberlin and played their home games at Welcome Stadium. Despite the Flyers finishing in a second place tie in the conference with a 6-2 conference record, they still had a chance to claim the PFL’s automatic bid in the FCS Playoffs (due to St. Thomas (MN) being ineligible due to their 5-year transition from Division III to Division I) but failed to do so after a narrow 24-23 loss to Dayton in the final week of the regular season.

Previous season

The Flyers finished the 2021 season 6–4, 5–3 in PFL play to finish in a tie for fifth place.

Preseason

Preseason coaches' poll
The Pioneer League released their preseason coaches' poll on August 1, 2022. The Flyers were picked to finish in fourth place.

Preseason All-PFL teams

Schedule

Game summaries

at Robert Morris

at Youngstown State

Kentucky State

Drake

at Butler

at Marist

Stetson

Valparaiso

at Presbyterian

Morehead State

at Davidson

References 

Dayton
Dayton Flyers football seasons
Dayton Flyers football